Fighting Talk is a topical sports show broadcast on BBC Radio 5 Live during the English football season. The show is broadcast on Saturday mornings for an hour between 1100 and 1200 and is based on a similar format to the ESPN show Around the Horn.

Its first series was broadcast in October 2003, presented by Johnny Vaughan. The second series was presented by Christian O'Connell. The current and longest-serving presenter has been Colin Murray, who took charge between 2006 and 2013 and returned to the show for the 2016–17 season. Murray announced on Twitter that he would step down as host at the end of the 2022-23 season but continue to fill in when his replacement takes holidays.

The show has twice won Gold Sony Radio Academy Awards in the sports programme category; in 2006 and 2011. For the latter, judges described the show as "like a modern version of old-fashioned Music Hall".

Format

The host chairs the show where four guest pundits are invited to expound in turn, preferably with wit and knowledge, their views and opinions on a series of topical sporting events. Most sports are thrown into the fray but there is a strong emphasis on English top-flight football and other sports covered by the British news media.

The penultimate discussion topic on the show is known as 'Any Other Business' (AOB) where the guests are given the opportunity to talk about anything they wish, and encouraged to comment on topics or issues that have irked, annoyed or incensed them in past week, regardless of relevance to sport.

Listener participation
The programme is interspersed with "listeners' homework" – listeners are asked to submit answers to one of the questions posed to the panel (normally question two) by e-mail or text message. During the course of the show, the presenter reads out the "best" responses, with the most entertaining answers being read out the following week. Homework questions often involve likening sports people to objects, animals or concepts: for example, "If footballers were houses, what would they be?"

Prizes were introduced to encourage respondents; in the first series, the prize for the best entry was a "soundbite" recording of a commentator or sportsman — being a brief piece of sporting commentary involving the winning respondent or recollections of the respondent's sporting prowess (both fictional). Contributors included Chris Waddle, Barry Fry and Jonathan Pearce. In keeping with the Park incident (see below), the results of this competition have been rigged on occasion — for example, Giles Boden (writer — see below) is a previous "winner"; his prize was a soundbite recorded for him by the former Chelsea manager Claudio Ranieri.

During the second series, a tangible prize was introduced in the form of a Fighting Talk mug – and as an added incentive, listeners were offered the chance to appear as guest pundits. Jim Thane was the first listener to be invited to compete live on the show, appearing in series two with Steve Bunce, Greg Brady and Dominic Holland. Richard Seymour was the second guest listener, appearing in the third series with Steve Bunce, Bob Mills and Kriss Akabusi. During the fourth series, Christopher Briggs joined a panel consisting of Will Buckley, John Rawling and Bob Mills.

Prizes were suspended during series 5 due to the BBC's blanket ban on hosting phone-in competitions, which came as a result of various phone-in and interactive voting scandals. Listeners were still encouraged to text and e-mail in answers by the presenter, immediately followed by a sarcastic remark from Colin Murray about Blue Peter, one of the BBC's programmes accused of misleading viewers. When considered in the context of the arbitrary nature of the show's scoring systems, the suspension seems somewhat ironic, particularly given that presenter corruption is tolerated to the point of being encouraged.

As of 19 September 2009 the listeners have been asked to submit a question, rather than answer the set question. The listener who is selected to pose the question over the phone is also given the power to award two bonus points to any panelist of his or her choice. The listener also receives a unique theme tune that no FT contestant will ever get. The listener-submitted question is always the second question of the show.

Defend the Indefensible
In order to decide the week's ultimate winner the two highest scoring pundits are invited to "Defend the Indefensible". Each pundit is called to vigorously support a topical theme for twenty seconds that is either distasteful, politically incorrect, plainly wrong, self-derisory or entirely contrary to the pundit's known opinions. Previous examples of defending the indefensible include "I’d gladly drink a pint of Maradona's liposuction fat for Comic Relief"; "cricket has been cheapened now common people and ladies have jumped on the bandwagon" and "I believe the annual Oxford-Cambridge boat race should take place in Iranian territorial waters".

For all the responses are often outrageously comedic, due to some being extremely near the knuckle, hosts have still had to reiterate on many occasions that the statements are not meant to be taken seriously in any way. Indeed, more often than not they actually have the intention of mocking those who would hold such an abhorrent view; even so, despite repeated clarification, complaints are still a fairly regular occurrence.

On occasion, the DTI round has been specifically designed for the pundit who has to answer. Examples include propositions posed to former England football manager Graham Taylor and Henning Wehn. After the resignation of Sven-Göran Eriksson from the position of England Manager, Taylor was invited to defend the statement "The next England manager should be Graham Taylor". In a later series, Wehn was asked to defend "The German football team should wear PVC Nazi outfits as a show of support to Max Mosley", in reference to the latter's court battle following revelations about Mosley's personal life.

Finalists who refuse to take part in the round forfeit the round and by extension, the game — for example, John Rawling refused to criticise his wife's cooking on the Christmas 2006 show, with the win being awarded to fellow panellist Des Kelly. Rawling was again asked to defend the proposition exactly a year later, and did so successfully.
Two episodes of Fighting Talk were won by pundits who did not have to participate in the DTI round:
On 17 September 2005, Bob Mills won a show after fellow finalist Steve Bunce refused to defend "John Rawling's debut as ITV boxing commentator was mediocre at best"; Bunce was replaced in the final by John Rawling, who was subsequently unable to respond to the proposition "Boxing's so gay, but that's why I like it".
In November 2006, Trevor Nelson was awarded a win after finalists Ian Stone and Clare Balding's efforts were deemed too terrible to win.
Martin Kelner became the first (and to date, only) person to be ejected from the DTI final on 25 April 2009 because Colin Murray claimed he was "being a wuss" in offering his place in the final to John Oliver.

Scoring

Guests earn arbitrary points for 'good punditry', but lose them if they waffle, use predictable clichés, or attempt to ingratiate themselves with the host. Scoring is accompanied by a variety of appropriate and humorous sound effects.

In the 24 January 2009 show, a new sound effect (being the start up music from Microsoft Windows XP) was introduced, to indicate a 'fact' that had been blatantly pulled by the contestant from Wikipedia or another online source.

Disordered and by no means fair, the system is sufficiently flexible to accommodate the presenter's moods, likes and dislikes and personal bias.  Pundits can start the game on positive scores, with points having been awarded for complimentary comments about the presenter; by contrast, many start on minus scores, with points having been deducted due to interruptions or negative comments about the presenter.

At the beginning of series four, Colin Murray introduced the "Golden Envelope" round. The presenter places his or her own answer to a particular question into an envelope prior to the show and poses the question to the pundits during the second half of that show: matching the answer in the envelope is worth ten bonus points.

Presenters can also 'fix' the outcome of show results for personal gain. Colin Murray arranged for Richard Park to win a show in 2007 because Park was a judge in the TV show Comic Relief does Fame Academy, in which Murray was a contestant. At one point, Park was in last place, but Murray put him into the final and gave him the win, without listening to the Defend the Indefensible round answer from fellow contestant Jim White.

Murray also decided an FA Cup Third Round show on 3 January 2009 in favour of former Wimbledon FA Cup Final goalscorer and Northern Ireland national football team manager Lawrie Sanchez, after both Sanchez and fellow finalist Martin Kelner failed to meet the 20 seconds required in Defend the Indefensible. On 9 November 2013, Bob Mills finished the show on zero points after a ridicule of Southampton's season left host Christian O'Connell aghast, and thus took all his points.

History
The first series began in October 2003 and was hosted by Johnny Vaughan. The inaugural show featured a panel consisting of Greg Brady, Will Buckley, Bradley Walsh and the eventual winner, Stan Collymore. After the first series ended in April 2004, Vaughan left to present the Capital FM breakfast show.

Christian O'Connell was the show's second presenter, and completed a successful second series from 2004 to 2005, culminating in a Gold Award for the show at the 24th Sony Radio Academy Awards. He left to focus on his new Virgin Radio breakfast show at the end of 2005. His last show was in December 2005, and featured his four favourite guests — John Rawling, Steve Bunce, Greg Brady and Bob Mills. That show also briefly featured the wives of three of those panellists, who were invited to answer (via telephone) a question on behalf of their husbands. Bob Mills' wife was unavailable for comment.

Colin Murray started presenting the show in February 2006. He was the host for seven years until he left in July 2013 as he moved from the BBC to present on rival network Talksport.

Following Murray's departure, he was replaced by three presenters who would rotate hosting duties. O'Connell returned as one of the presenters, with commentator Jonathan Pearce and TV presenter Matt Johnson the others for the 2013–14 season.

For two seasons, 2014–15 and 2015–16, hosting duties were shared between presenter Georgie Thompson and comedian Josh Widdicombe. Murray returned to the show on 17 September 2016 and has now been the host for over 10 years.

Guest presenters
Vaughan came back for 'one week only' on 10 March 2007 because Murray was appearing in the reality television programme Comic Relief does Fame Academy. However, he has since made two other guest appearances as chairman while Murray has been away. The show has also had a number of other guest presenters to cover for when the host is unavailable, including well-known British broadcasters such as Dickie Davies, Kelly Cates, Jimmy Tarbuck, Gabby Logan, Terry Wogan, Phil Williams, Sam Quek and Nick Hancock.

Producer Mike Holt has also had to present the show for one question when Colin Murray could not bring himself to adjudicate a round questioning his favourite team by asking "What's wrong with Liverpool Football Club?" Murray left the studio for the duration of the question.

The 'Stuart Hall incident'
Fighting Talk made national news with an episode broadcast on 12 March 2005. The panel consisted of Danny Kelly, Will Buckley, John Rawling and Stuart Hall. The presenter, Christian O'Connell, asked the panel "What other former all-conquering nations, clubs or individuals would you like to see have a renaissance?". Stuart Hall responded "Zimbabwe", and criticised what Robert Mugabe had done to the country, saying "...don your flannels, black up, play leather on willow with Mugabe cast as a witch doctor. Imagine him out at Lords casting a curse; tincture of bat's tongues, gorilla's gonads, tiger's testicles...". Shortly afterwards, O'Connell was heard to ask studio staff "Are we still on air?" During the same show, Hall was also asked for his opinion on sporting stars acting as role models for young people. In his response, he defended swearing by footballers suggesting that "your average 10-year-old can instruct you in oral or anal sex". The incidents were widely reported in the national press, although neither attracted significant criticism from listeners.

The Champion of Champions Show
Starting in 2010, the final episode of Fighting Talk for every season was dubbed the Champion of Champions show. The top four panelists who had appeared in (but not necessarily won) the DTI final the most over the course of the season would appear. The format would be the same, but some of the questions in the final episode would look back over the sporting events that occurred during the season, as well as looking forward to the UEFA Champions League Final as it either fell on the same day or a few days later.

Pundits

Pundits are generally British and Irish sports journalists, sportspeople or stand-up comics.

Regulars include:
 Dougie Anderson – TV and Radio presenter (nicknamed "Three Answers")
 Greg Brady – Sports journalist
 Will Buckley – Sports journalist
 Steve Bunce – Sports journalist
 Simon Day – Comedian
 Neil Delamere – Comedian
 Gail Emms – Sportsperson
 Elis James – Comedian 
 Eddie Kadi – Comedian
 Des Kelly – Sports journalist
 Martin Kelner – Sports journalist
 Katharine Merry – Sportsperson
 Bob Mills – Comedian
 Justin Moorhouse – Comedian
 Pat Nevin – Sportsperson
 Eleanor Oldroyd – Sports journalist (labelled "The First Lady of Fighting Talk")
 Richard Osman – TV presenter 
 Natalie Pike – TV presenter
 John Rawling – Sports journalist (nicknamed "Psycho")
 Paul Sinha – Comedian
 Mark Watson – Comedian
 Henning Wehn – Comedian
 Jim White – Sports journalist

However, some non-UK pundits have made appearances, including Greg Brady (who participates regularly by ISDN from Toronto, Canada). On 27 October 2007, Brady made an appearance in the studio due to being in London for the first NFL regular season game to be played outside the USA. He has made appearances in the UK every year since then, including the 24 October 2009 broadcast which came live from Hull.

Other non-UK contestants include Australian comedians Charlie Pickering and Jim Jeffries, English-born New Zealand comedian Al Pitcher and German comedian Henning Wehn. American comic Doug Stanhope made an appearance on the 13 September 2008 episode, as he was touring Britain at the time. Adam Richman, host of Man vs. Food, appeared on 17 November 2012, but did so on ISDN rather than in studio. Also, American comedian Alex Edelman has been appearing on the show since 2019.

Music and sound effects

The show's distinctive theme tune comes from the track "Sabotage" by Beastie Boys, which first appeared on their 1994 album Ill Communication. The segment used is from the middle of the track. The song was replaced with a different version due to contractual reasons in 2010, but made a one-off appearance on the 5 May 2012 episode as a tribute to MCA (aka Adam Yauch), who had died the day before aged 47 and to whom that episode was dedicated.

The music usually playing while the host gives the scores is the theme from the British TV show Grandstand, and during the final segment, Defend the Indefensible, the theme from the Rocky series, "Gonna Fly Now", is used.

Other sound effects used throughout each show include the various pundit themes; the theme from Allo Allo; Planet Funk's "Chase the Sun"; the German, Italian and American national anthems; the Indiana Jones theme; "The Lonely Man" from The Incredible Hulk, "Burning Heart" from Rocky IV, and the Grange Hill theme tune among others.

Fighting Talk in other media
The show made a brief appearance on television (2004, BBC2, in an early evening slot) presented and written by Johnny Vaughan and was true to the popular radio format. The scoring sound effects were juxtaposed with complementary images shown on large screens. At one stage negotiations were believed to be under way for Colin Murray to host a live style format in the Camden-based MTV studios which would air on Sky One during the close season.

In late 2010 ITV4 broadcast one series of Mark Watson Kicks Off, a looser television adaptation of Fighting Talk less closely related to the radio version than the 2004 BBC series.

The programme has also made outside broadcasts through the years throughout the United Kingdom, a number of which coincided with the BBC Sports Personality of the Year ceremony in December.

Fighting Talk: Any Other Business
A one-off, politics-based show — using the name of Fighting Talk'''s 'Any Other Business' round — was broadcast on Sunday 17 December 2006 at 7pm, presented by Richard Bacon. A run of four further shows billed as Fighting Talk: Any Other Business were broadcast between 15 July and 5 August 2007. The host was the original Fighting Talk presenter Johnny Vaughan and guests included Alan Duncan, Diane Abbott, Stephen Pound, Arabella Weir and Robin Ince.

Internet resources

The most popular and well known fan-site is located on the social networking website Facebook, under the name 'The Fighting Talk Appreciation Society'. It is occasionally mentioned on the show by the presenter.

In 2009 the show introduced a "secret" group on the social networking website Facebook, called 'FT316' for listeners to post their suggestions for question 2. Originally they did not give the name of the group on air, but a link was sent to anyone who requested it by email. This idea was scrapped after a couple of shows and now the presenter just tells listeners to go to the page, giving them the name of it on air. The 316 comes from the number of one of the sound effects in the BBC library, later found to be one number out from what it should be.

PodcastFighting Talk became available as an mp3 download in October 2004, with a podcast version following as part of a BBC trial in February 2005. Each show can be accessed for download on the BBC website in either format for one week after broadcast. Much comment is made by the presenters about the performance of the podcast in the iTunes chart (in either the Sport or Comedy categories, or the overall podcast chart) – with a previous best of number 5 in the overall chart (series three).

Following the Russell Brand Show prank telephone calls row, the BBC introduced a system of editing 'controversial' content of some shows before making them available as podcasts. The three most noticeable edits to date have been made to DTI rounds — the first involved the show recorded at Goodison Park (see above), where Pat Nevin was asked to defend the statement I'd gladly swap every game I played for Everton and Tranmere for just one night with Wayne Rooney's granny. Nevin's original answer in the live broadcast included the statement "sloppy seconds from Wayne Rooney just sounds like pure class to me" but the line was cut for the podcast.

The second involved the show broadcast on 16 May 2009, when Bob Mills was asked to defend a statement involving ex-cricketer Chris Lewis's appearance in court in relation to cocaine smuggling. Both the DTI statement and Mills's response were removed from the podcast. Mills was also edited out of the podcast of the 1 June 2013 broadcast, after he was asked to defend the statement "Give me 20 minutes with her and I’m pretty sure I could turn around Clare Balding." The statement, as well as Mills's response, was removed from the podcast before its official release, although fans made available an unabridged version recorded from DAB radio, via a number of sources, in a protest against the British newspaper the Daily Mail. The number of downloads of the uncut version reached four figures.

Several podcasts in series 6 contain bonus audio clips that can be heard after several minutes of silence at the end of the broadcast recording. The sections generally consist of studio chatter between the host and panellists, often recorded during off-air audio level tests. The most notable can be found on the podcast recording of the show broadcast on 28 March 2009, when panellist Perry Groves can be heard singing along to "Love Really Hurts Without You" by Billy Ocean.

Book
The first Fighting Talk tie-in book, Fighting Talk: Flimsy Facts, Sweeping Statements and Inspired Sporting Hunches'', edited by regular pundit Will Buckley, was published by Hodder & Stoughton on 2 October 2008.

References

External links

Podcast RSS feed

BBC Radio 5 Live programmes
BBC Radio comedy programmes
2003 radio programme debuts
British panel games
British radio game shows
2000s British game shows
2010s British game shows
British sports radio programmes